Road Romeo is a Kannada movie released in year 2007.

The plot centers around Dilipa, played by Dilip Pai, an irresponsible young man from a lower income family. He falls for Anjali, played by Ashitha, who rejects him because of his irresponsibility. Thanks to Anjali's encouragement, Dilipa learns to be a responsible man.

The movie was created by Pai's brother in an attempt to launch an acting career for him. The director was Sai Prakash.

R.G. Vijayasarathy of Rediff describes the film as lackluster. He criticizes the film's poor script, technical staff, and music. However, he praised the performances of the actors. The Times of India generally agreed, describing the film as lacking creativity. However, the Times found the music and technical work to be acceptable. The Times also praised the performance of the actors.

References

External links

2007 films
2000s Kannada-language films